Stella-Maris-De-Kent Hospital is a Canadian Catholic hospital located in the town of Sainte-Anne-de-Kent, New Brunswick.It is operated by Vitalité Health Network. 
It is an acute care community hospital and provides services to Kent County.

See also
List of hospitals in New Brunswick

References

External links
Stella-Maris-De-Kent Hospital

Hospitals in New Brunswick
Buildings and structures in Kent County, New Brunswick
Hospitals established in 1947